Betar Maurkah Gallant is an American engineer who is an associate professor at Massachusetts Institute of Technology. Her research investigates the development of new materials for batteries. She worked with Barack Obama on an educational initiative to train young Americans in clean energy.

Early life and education 
Gallant grew up in a scientific family: her mother worked in urban planning and her father worked in engineering. While she was a teenager, Gallant's father died from an illness and she started to read his old physics textbooks. Gallant was an undergraduate at Massachusetts Institute of Technology, and took part in a Undergraduate Research Opportunities Program with Yang Shao-Horn. Together they explored electrochemistry. During 2009, Gallant joined the United States Department of Energy Energy Technology Program, where she led the Regaining our Energy Science and Engineering Edge initiative. RE-ENERGYSE was developed by the Obama White House to educate young Americans in clean energy research. Gallant completed her doctoral research at Massachusetts Institute of Technology, where she developed carbon nanotube structures for lithium batteries supervised by Shao-Horn.

Research and career 
Gallant moved to California Institute of Technology, where she woked as a Kavli Nanoscience Fellow. Shewas appointed to the faculty at MIT in 2015. She initially investigated the incorporation of carbon dioxide into batteries as a strategy to mitigate greenhouse gases. This research led her to investigate the electrochemical reactions of carbon dioxide, and propose new strategies to simplify carbon capture. She pioneered the use of electrochemical strategies to separate carbon dioxide from amine, the sorbent molecule used in carbon capture and storage. She showed that by separating the carbon dioxide and the amine, it was possible to extend the reaction, eventually making a stable solid form of carbon dioxide that was easy to separate. Gallant has studied the mechanisms that underpin the solid electrolyte interphase (SEI).

Despite non-rechargeable batteries being critical in medical devices like pacemakers, so far, innovation in battery research has mainly considered rechargeable batteries. Gallant decided to address this research gap, developing long-lasting non-rechargeable batteries based on fluorinated electrolytes.

Awards and honors 
 2016 MIT Bose Research Fellow
 2019 Army Research Office Young Investigator
 2019 Ruth and Joel Spira Award for Distinguished Teaching
 2019 Scialog Fellow Advanced Energy Storage Fellow
 2020 Scialog Fellow Negative Emissions Science Fellow
 2021 National Science Foundation CAREER Award
 2021 ECS Battery Division Early Career Award
 2022 ECS Toyota Young Investigator Fellowship

Selected publications

References 

Living people
Massachusetts Institute of Technology alumni
Massachusetts Institute of Technology faculty
American women engineers
21st-century American engineers
21st-century American women scientists
21st-century women engineers
California Institute of Technology fellows
Year of birth missing (living people)